Saddle Creek is the first shopping center in the nation developed as a lifestyle center. It is located in the eastern Memphis, Tennessee suburb of Germantown, and it contains national specialty shops and restaurants, including Altar'd State, Anthropologie, Apple Store, Athleta, Banana Republic, Brahmin, Brooks Brothers, Free People, J.Crew, Kendra Scott, Lovesac, lululemon, Madewell, Michael Kors, Paper Source, Rise Southern Biscuits & Righteous Chicken, SEE Eyewear, Sephora, Soft Surroundings, Stoney River, UNTUCKit, Vera Bradley and more. About 70% of tenants are unique to the Memphis market. Crumbl Cookies, Evereve, and Fabletics are joining the center in 2022.

Saddle Creek straddles Poplar Avenue, with Saddle Creek North located at Poplar Avenue and West Farmington Boulevard and Saddle Creek South located at Poplar Avenue and West Street. The center offers pet friendly shopping and complimentary Wi-Fi. 

Saddle Creek was voted Best Shopping Center/Mall in Memphis by the readers of the Commercial Appeal 2018 through 2021, and the readers of the Memphis Flyer 2017 through 2021.

Trademark Property Company currently manages Saddle Creek.

See also
List of shopping malls in Tennessee

References

External links
Shops of Saddle Creek

Shopping malls in Tennessee
Shopping malls established in 1987
Buildings and structures in Shelby County, Tennessee
Tourist attractions in Shelby County, Tennessee
Germantown, Tennessee